is the eighth single released by the Japanese boyband Kanjani8. The single featured two versions, a limited and regular edition. The limited edition single came with a seven-page photobook.

Because this single was the eighth one that they released, they played on the pronunciation of the number 8, hachi, with the pronunciation of the Japanese word for bee, also hachi, and used it for hidden gag in the CD's promotion and jacket art. Shota Yasuda dressed up like a bee and was featured in the promotional video and limited edition CD booklet.

Track listing

Regular Edition
 " Wahaha "
 " Dare yori mo Suki dakara "
 " BJ "
 " Wahaha  <Original Karaoke> "

Limited Edition
 " Wahaha "
 " Dare yori mo Suki dakara "
 " Wahaha  <Original Karaoke> "

Charts

References

2007 singles
Kanjani Eight songs
Oricon Weekly number-one singles
Billboard Japan Hot 100 number-one singles
2007 songs